Luton Town F.C. (LTFC) is an English football club.

LTFC may also refer to:

Football clubs

England
Leek Town F.C.
Leighton Town F.C.
Littlehampton Town F.C.
London Tigers F.C.
Louth Town F.C.
Lowestoft Town F.C.
Lutterworth Town F.C.
Lydd Town F.C.
Lydney Town F.C.
Lye Town F.C.
Lymington Town F.C.

Scotland
Largs Thistle F.C.
Larkhall Thistle F.C.
Lothian Thistle Hutchison Vale F.C.

Ireland
Longford Town F.C.

Wales
Llandudno Town F.C.
Llangefni Town F.C.

Other meanings
 Isparta Süleyman Demirel Airport, Turkey 
 Latif Chang railway station, Pakistan